A spurious diphthong (or false diphthong) is an Ancient Greek vowel that is etymologically a long vowel but written exactly like a true diphthong  (ei, ou).

Origin
A spurious diphthong has two origins: from compensatory lengthening of short  (e, o) after deletion of a consonant or contraction of two vowels:

 *mónt-ya or *móntʰ-ya → *mónsa (assibilation from palatalization) →  "Muse"
 doter-ya  →  "giver" (feminine; compare masculine )

  →  "you (pl.) love"
  →  "mind"

The specific rules are more complex.

True diphthongs
By contrast, true diphthongs are e or o placed before i or u. Some come from e-grade of ablaut + i, or o-grade + u, co-existing beside forms with the other grade:

  "I leave" (e-grade: genuine diphthong) —  "I have left" (o-grade)
 *eleútʰ-somai →  "I will come" (e-grade) —  Homeric  "I have come" (o-grade)
 Proto-Greek *akouyō →  "I hear"

Pronunciation
By the Classical period, the diphthong and long vowel had merged in pronunciation and were both pronounced as long monophthongs .

In Modern Greek, distinctive vowel length has been lost, and all vowels are pronounced short: .

Other dialects
In earlier Severer Doric, by contrast, only  counted as a long vowel, and it was the vowel of contraction.

References

Greek grammar
Ancient Greek
Vowels